WAKE (1500 AM) is a radio station broadcasting an oldies format.

WAKE had an adult standards format until 2009, when it briefly switched to CNN Headline News, before adopting a classic country format in 2010.  In November 2011, the station switched back to standards, using Dial Global Local's The Lounge format.

After "The Lounge" was discontinued on June 17, 2012, WAKE switched to an oldies/classic hits format featuring hit music chiefly from the 1970s and early 1980s, again using a Dial Global source.

Licensed to Valparaiso, Indiana, United States, the station is currently owned by Marion R. Williams.

WAKE is a Class D radio station broadcasting on the clear-channel frequency of 1500 kHz.

WAKE went off the air in June 2018.  The owners have applied to the FCC (for a construction permit) to move to Hobart, Indiana.

In August 2022, the station was taken over by Larry Langford Jr. and is currently simulcasting his other station WGTO, which airs MetvFM.

References

External links

AKE